Leidy Township is a township in Clinton County, Pennsylvania, United States. The population was 155 at the 2020 census, down from 180 in 2010. Kettle Creek State Park is located in Leidy Township.

Geography
Leidy Township is in northern Clinton County and is bordered by Potter County to the north and partially by Cameron County to the west.

Demographics

As of the census of 2000, there were 229 people, 117 households, and 69 families residing in the township. The population density was 2.4 people per square mile (0.9/km). There were 759 housing units at an average density of 7.8/sq mi (3.0/km). The racial makeup of the township was 97.82% White, 1.31% Native American and 0.87% Asian.

There were 117 households, out of which 16.2% had children under the age of 18 living with them, 53.0% were married couples living together, 6.0% had a female householder with no husband present, and 40.2% were non-families. 35.9% of all households were made up of individuals, and 19.7% had someone living alone who was 65 years of age or older. The average household size was 1.96 and the average family size was 2.53.

In the township the population was spread out, with 13.5% under the age of 18, 3.5% from 18 to 24, 19.7% from 25 to 44, 39.3% from 45 to 64, and 24.0% who were 65 years of age or older. The median age was 52 years. For every 100 females, there were 112.0 males. For every 100 females age 18 and over, there were 106.3 males.

The median income for a household in the township was $33,125, and the median income for a family was $37,000. Males had a median income of $40,313 versus $16,875 for females. The per capita income for the township was $28,279. About 4.7% of families and 8.4% of the population were below the poverty line, including 23.1% of those under the age of eighteen and 3.4% of those sixty five or over.

References

Populated places established in 1813
Townships in Clinton County, Pennsylvania
Townships in Pennsylvania